The 2022–23 season is the 73rd season in the history of Stade Brestois 29 and their fourth consecutive season in the top flight. The club are participating in Ligue 1 and the Coupe de France. The season covers the period from 1 July 2022 to 30 June 2023.

Players

First-team squad

Out on loan

Transfers

In

Out

Pre-season and friendlies

Competitions

Overall record

Ligue 1

League table

Results summary

Results by round

Matches 
The league fixtures were announced on 17 June 2022.

Coupe de France

Statistics

Appearances and goals 

Last updated 28 August 2022.

|-
! colspan=14 style=background:#dcdcdc; text-align:center| Goalkeepers

|-

! colspan=14 style=background:#dcdcdc; text-align:center| Defenders

|-

! colspan=14 style=background:#dcdcdc; text-align:center| Midfielders

|-

! colspan=14 style=background:#dcdcdc; text-align:center| Forwards

|}

Top scorers 
Includes all competitive matches. The list is sorted by squad number when total goals are equal.

Last updated 28 August 2022.

Cleansheets 
Includes all competitive matches. The list is sorted by squad number when total cleansheets are equal.

Last updated 28 August 2022.

Disciplinary record 
Includes all competitive matches.

Last updated 28 August 2022.

References 

Stade Brestois 29 seasons
Brest